The flora of Venezuela consists of a huge variety of unique plants; around 38% of the estimated 30,000 species of plants found in the country are endemic to Venezuela. Overall, around 48% of Venezuela's land is forested; this includes over 60% of the Venezuelan Amazon. These rainforests are increasingly endangered by mining and logging activities.

Venezuela's habitats range from the Andes mountains in the west to the Amazon Basin rainforest in the south, via extensive Llanos plains and Caribbean coast in the center and the Orinoco River Delta in the east. They include xeric scrublands in the extreme northwest and coastal mangrove forests in the northeast. Its cloud forests and lowland rainforests are particularly rich, for example hosting over 25,000 species of orchids. These include the flor de mayo orchid (Cattleya mossiae), the national flower. Venezuela's national tree is the araguaney, whose characteristic lushness after the rainy season led novelist Rómulo Gallegos to name it «[l]a primavera de oro de los araguaneyes» ("the golden spring of the araguaneyes").

Line notes

References 
 BBC News. New species uncovered in Venezuela.
 Global Forest Watch. Venezuela: Overview